Al Qurm is a suburb of the city of Ras Al Khaimah in the United Arab Emirates (UAE). It is the location of the 250-room Radisson Blu Hotel Al Qurm.

See also 
 Qurum

References 

Populated places in the Emirate of Ras Al Khaimah